Beremend is a village in Baranya County, Hungary on the Croatian border. Residents are Magyars, with minority of Serbs.   
Until the end of World War II, the Inhabitants was Danube Swabians, also called locally as Stifolder, because there Ancestors once came at the 17th century and 18th century from Fulda (district). Mostly of the former German Settlers was expelled to Allied-occupied Germany and Allied-occupied Austria in 1945–1948, about the Potsdam Agreement.
Only a few Germans of Hungary live there, the majority today are the descendants of Hungarians from the Czechoslovak–Hungarian population exchange. They got the houses of the former Danube Swabians Inhabitants.

Average Weather in Beremend
In Beremend, the summers are warm, the winters  very cold, and it is partly cloudy year round. Over the course of the year, the temperature typically varies from 28 °F to 83 °F and is rarely below 16 °F or above 92 °F.

EU Refugee Crisis
Thousands of refugees arrived from Croatia enter Hungary as Hungarian army members take security measures at Hungarian-Croatian border on September 19, 2015. Thousands drowned while trying the cross the Mediterranean from Libya and Turkey to Europe, prompting an EU-wide mission to intercept people attempting to make the crossing. However, Hungary sent armored vehicles to its border with Croatia, as tensions mounted between the neighboring countries over the migrant crisis.

References

External links

  in Hungarian, English, German and Croatian
 Street map 

Populated places in Baranya County
Serb communities in Hungary